imagine is a Bruneian  telecommunications company and provider that offers various services to the consumer and enterprise sectors, with its mainstay being high speed broadband (HSBB) and telephone services over fibre optics infrastructure. At present, the company offers a minimum bandwidth of 20 Mbit/s with several other packages that can reach speeds of 300 Mbit/s. Based on demand, TelBru also has the capability to provide 2.5 Gbit/s. The company also provides IT services for corporate as well as government clients.

History 
The company was incorporated as TelBru on 30 May 2002. It has been operated since April 2006 when the Department of Telekom Brunei (JTB) was corporatized on 1 April 2006. As of the end of 2017, the company employs more than 900 staff.

On 7 December 2019, Telbru officially announced their rebranding to imagine.

Location and branches 

The company headquarters is located at 6th Floor of the RBA Plaza building and its operation center (TelHouse) is located at Sumbiling, Bandar Seri Begawan.

The company has a total of 10 retail branches throughout the country.

Products and services 
 High Speed Broadband (HSBB)
 Telephony services
 TelBru DMR
 Video conferencing
 e-Domain
 Lease line
Global IP Transit
 International Bandwidth
 Premium Voice
 Wholesale Voice
 SMS Gateway
 Fixed Wireless 
 Nationwide Wi-Fi

Company logo

References

External links

Telecommunications companies of Brunei
Telecommunications companies established in 2005
2005 establishments in Brunei
Mobile phone companies of Brunei